William Ralph Boyce Gibson (15 March 1869 – 2 April 1935) was a British-Australian philosopher. He was an advocate of personal idealism.

Biography
He was born in Paris, the son of Reverend William Gibson, a Methodist minister and his wife Helen Wilhelmina, daughter of William Binnington Boyce.

He married Lucy Judge Peacock in 1898; they had five children including Alexander Boyce Gibson, Ralph Siward Gibson and Quentin Boyce Gibson.

In 1911 he was appointed to the chair of mental and moral philosophy at the University of Melbourne, a position he held until his retirement in 1934.

Gibson died in Surrey Hills, Victoria.

Selected publications

A Philosophical Introduction to Ethics (1904)
Rudolf Eucken's Philosophy of Life (1906)
The Problem of Logic (1908, 1914)
God with Us: A Study in Religious Idealism (1909)

References

Sources 
 "Gibson, William Ralph Boyce,"  Who Was Who, A & C Black, 1920–2008; online edition, Oxford University Press, Dec. 2007, accessed 31 Jan. 2012.

1869 births
1935 deaths
British philosophers
Australian philosophers
Academic staff of the University of Melbourne
Founders of the British Psychological Society
Idealists